Nicholas John Henry Kimber (born 16 January 2001) is an English cricketer. He made his List A debut on 30 July 2021, for Surrey in the 2021 Royal London One-Day Cup.

References

External links
 

2001 births
Living people
English cricketers
Surrey cricketers
Cricketers from Lincoln, England